Mohamed Abd Al-Jawad (born 28 November 1962 in Jeddah) is former Saudi Arabian football defender. His nickname is flying wing. Mário Zagallo gave him his number 13 in Saudi national team while he was training Saudi National team, Al-Jawad played with Saudi national team from 1980 to 1994 and played for Al-Ahli from 1978 to 1995. Now works as an agent for football (soccer) players.

Achievements
Al-Ahli
 Saudi Premier League : 1977–78, 1983–84
 King Cup : 1978, 1979, 1983
 Gulf Club Champions Cup : 1985
 Prince Faisal bin Fahd League : 1982
Saudi Arabia
 AFC Asian Cup: 
Winner: 1984, 1988

Personal life
After retirement Abdal-jwad works as analyst and interviewer on TV aside Arabic he is fluent in English and Portuguese.

See also
 List of men's footballers with 100 or more international caps

References

External links
Picture

1962 births
Living people
Saudi Arabian footballers
Saudi Arabia international footballers
Olympic footballers of Saudi Arabia
Footballers at the 1984 Summer Olympics
1984 AFC Asian Cup players
1988 AFC Asian Cup players
1994 FIFA World Cup players
AFC Asian Cup-winning players
Al-Ahli Saudi FC players
Saudi Professional League players
FIFA Century Club
Asian Games medalists in football
Footballers at the 1986 Asian Games
Sportspeople from Jeddah
Asian Games silver medalists for Saudi Arabia
Association football defenders
Medalists at the 1986 Asian Games